The People Who Grinned Themselves to Death is the second and final studio album by The Housemartins. It was released in 1987, and produced three singles - "Five Get Over Excited" (#11 UK), "Me and the Farmer" (#15) and "Build" (#15 UK). The title song is about the British Royal Family, which found them gaining controversy in the tabloid papers similar to that of other bands such as the Sex Pistols, The Smiths and The Stone Roses.

Critical reception

The People Who Grinned Themselves to Death was ranked number nine among "Albums of the Year" for 1987 in the annual NME critics' poll.

Track listing
All tracks written by Paul Heaton and Stan Cullimore

"The People Who Grinned Themselves to Death" – 3:33
"I Can't Put My Finger on It"  – 2:28
"The Light Is Always Green"  – 3:59
"The World's on Fire" – 3:20
"Pirate Aggro" – 1:52
"We're Not Going Back"  – 2:53
"Me and the Farmer"  – 2:54
"Five Get Over Excited"  – 2:44
"Johannesburg"  – 3:55
"Bow Down" – 3:04
"You Better Be Doubtful" – 2:32
"Build" – 4:45

Charts

Personnel

The Housemartins
Norman Cook – bass, vocals
Dave Hemingway – drums, vocals
P.d. Heaton – vocals, guitar, trombone, harmonica
Stan Cullimore – guitar, vocals

Additional musicians
Guy Barker – trumpet
Sandy Blair – tuba
St. Winifred's School Choir – backing vocals on "Bow Down"
Pete Wingfield – piano, keyboards

Technical personnel
John Williams – producer
The Housemartins – producer
Phil Bodger – engineer
David Storey – sleeve design
John Sims – sleeve design
Phil Rainey – front cover photography
Derek Ridgers – band photography
John Woods – band photography

Certifications

References

The Housemartins albums
1987 albums
Go! Discs albums